Thomas Clarkson (1760–1846) was an English abolitionist.

Thomas Clarkson may also refer to:

 Tom Clarkson (rugby league), English rugby league footballer of the 1910s, 1920s and 1930s
 Tom Clarkson (rugby union) (born 2000), Irish rugby union player of the 2020s
 Thomas Clarkson (Upper Canada) (1800s–1874), Canadian businessman and founder of Clarkson Gordon
 Thomas S. Clarkson (1837–1894), American businessman and philanthropist
 Thomas W. Clarkson, heavy metals toxicologist
 Thomas Clarkson (footballer) (1865–1915), English footballer
 Tom Clarkson (Waterloo Road), a character in the TV series Waterloo Road